Jkhr. Jacob Eduard van Heemskerck van Beest (28 February 1828 – 24 December 1894) was a Dutch painter.

Biography
Jacob Eduard van Heemskerck van Beest was born on 28 February 1828 in Kampen in the United Kingdom of the Netherlands. He was the son of a sea captain, Dirk van Heemskerck van Beest, and followed his father to join the Dutch navy at the age of 14. He served in the navy from 1842 to 1853 before resigning and moving to Utrecht where he became a painter, focusing on naval historical pictures and general shipping scenes. He was a pupil of Dirk van Lokhorst, a notable painter of the Dutch modern school.

In 1867, Van Heemskerck van Beest moved to The Hague where he became a member of the "De Witte" society in 1872. He then lived in Dalfsen between 1879 and 1885. He was the first teacher of his daughter, the painter Jacoba van Heemskerck. He died at the age of 66 in The Hague on 24 December 1894.

Gallery

Notes

References

External links 
	

Jacob Eduard van Heemskerck van Beest on Artnet	
	

1828 births
1894 deaths
19th-century Dutch painters
Dutch male painters
Dutch marine artists
People from Kampen, Overijssel
19th-century Dutch male artists